The Source Family is a 2012 feature documentary film directed by Jodi Wille and Maria Demopoulos which recounts the story of Father Yod, Ya Ho Wa 13 and the Source Family. Much material was gleaned from Isis Aquarian's archives of photos, diary, film, cassette tapes of Father Yod's morning class, lost music tapes, graphics; along with input interviews of Source family members and people who knew Jim Baker (Father Yod) and / or went to the Source Restaurant.

The film premiered in competition at South by Southwest Film Festival 2012 and screened at festivals Silverdocs, Seattle International Film Festival and San Francisco International Film Festival, with special screenings at True/False Festival "Boonedawdle" and Hot Docs Canadian International Documentary Festival "Doc Soup" series.

In May 2013, the film was released theatrically, premiering at IFC Center in New York City, where its run was extended for over a month. The film screened in 60 cities and had extended runs in Los Angeles, Portland, San Francisco, and Nashville. It is distributed by Drag City and Gravitas Ventures.

The Source Family provides a view of the group through their own archival photos, home movies, audio recordings, and contemporary interviews with members of the family. Serving as a highly personal, insider's guide to the counter-culture movement of the early 70s, the film is inspired by the cult-classic book The Source: The Story of Father Yod, Ya Ho Wa 13, and The Source Family (Process Media), which was written by Isis Aquarian and Electricity Aquarian and edited by director Jodi Wille.

The documentary features music by Yo Ha Wa, the band composed of members of the Source Family with Father Yod as lead singer.

References

External links
 
 
 

American documentary films
Documentary films about Los Angeles
2012 films
2012 documentary films
2010s English-language films
2010s American films